Hooks  may refer to:

Places
United States
 Hooks, Alabama, an unincorporated community
 Hooks, Texas, a city
 Hooks Island, an island, New York

People
 Hooks (surname)
 Hooks (nickname)

Other uses
 Corpus Christi Hooks, a minor league team in the Texas League
 The Hooks, a faction in the Hook and Cod Wars
 Hooks (album), by Dutch rock and roll and blues group Herman Brood & His Wild Romance
 Hooks (grappling), a term for the use of feet and legs to control an opponent
  Hooks are used in computer programming to add or change functionality of software

See also
 Hook's Drug Stores, a former American drug store chain
 Hook (disambiguation)
 Hooke (disambiguation)
 Hooke's law